Kotila may refer to:

Kotila, Mahakali, Nepal
Kotila, Seti, Nepal